MPLC  may refer to:
 Medium pressure liquid chromatography, a type of column chromatography
 Motion Picture Licensing Corporation, an international, independent copyright licensing agency
 Movimento Popular de Libertação de Cabinda (Popular Movement for the Liberation of Cabinda), a militant separatist group fighting for the independence of Cabinda from Angola